Phytoecia erivanica is a species of beetle in the family Cerambycidae. It was described by Reitter in 1899, originally as a varietas of Phytoecia pici. It is known from Iran, Armenia, and possibly Turkey.

References

Phytoecia
Beetles described in 1899